Fulton High School, or FHS, is a public four-year high school located in Fulton, Illinois, a small city of Whiteside County, Illinois. FHS is part of River Bend Community Unit School District, which serves the communities of Fulton and Albany, and includes River Bend Middle School, and Fulton Elementary School. The campus is less than 2 miles from Clinton, Iowa, which lies just across the Mississippi River, and 25 miles northwest of Sterling, Illinois. The school serves a mixed small city, village, and rural residential community. The school lies within the Sterling micropolitan statistical area.

Academics
In 2009, Fulton High School did not make Adequate Yearly Progress, with 57% of students meeting standards, on the Prairie State Achievement Examination, a state test that is part of the No Child Left Behind Act. The school's average high school graduation rate between 1999-2009 was 89%.

Athletics
Fulton High School competes in the Three Rivers Conference and is a member school in the Illinois High School Association. Its mascot is the Steamers. The school has 2 state championships on record in team athletics or activities, both in Boys Football in 1976-77 and 1991-92.

History
Albany High School, to the south of Fulton, shut its doors in 1944 and students went to neighboring Fulton and Cordova (now deactivated and incorporated into Riverdale) High Schools with the Albany school district paying the tuition.

References

External links
 
 River Bend Community Unit School District 1

Public high schools in Illinois
Schools in Whiteside County, Illinois